Puzeh-ye Kuh (also Romanized as Pūzeh-ye Kūh) is a village in Sirch Rural District, Shahdad District, Kerman County, Kerman Province, Iran. At the 2006 census, its population was 32, in 8 families.

References 

Populated places in Kerman County